Joseph Richardson (February 1, 1778 – September 25, 1871) was a U.S. Representative from Massachusetts.

Born in Billerica, Massachusetts, Richardson attended public and private schools. He was graduated from Dartmouth College, Hanover, New Hampshire, in 1802. He was a teacher in Charlestown 1804-1806. He studied theology and was ordained a minister and assigned to the first parish of the Unitarian Church in Hingham on July 2, 1806. He served as delegate to the state constitutional convention in 1820. He served as member of the state house of representatives in 1821 and 1822. He served in the state senate in 1823, 1824, and 1826.

Richardson was elected as an Adams candidate to the Twentieth Congress and reelected as an Anti-Jacksonian to the Twenty-first Congresses (March 4, 1827 – March 3, 1831). He declined to be a candidate for renomination in 1830 to the Twenty-second Congress.

He resumed his ministerial duties, and died in Hingham, Massachusetts, on September 25, 1871. He was interred in Old Ship Cemetery.

See also

Politics of the United States

References

External links
 

1778 births
1871 deaths
Dartmouth College alumni
Massachusetts Democratic-Republicans
19th-century American politicians
People from Billerica, Massachusetts
National Republican Party members of the United States House of Representatives from Massachusetts